Mauro Gallo (born 6 May 1979) is an Italian former swimmer who competed in the 2000 Summer Olympics.

References

1979 births
Living people
Italian male freestyle swimmers
Olympic swimmers of Italy
Swimmers at the 2000 Summer Olympics
Universiade medalists in swimming
Mediterranean Games gold medalists for Italy
Mediterranean Games medalists in swimming
Swimmers at the 2001 Mediterranean Games
Universiade silver medalists for Italy
Swimmers of Centro Sportivo Carabinieri
Medalists at the 1999 Summer Universiade
21st-century Italian people